Jay Jacobs is president of PIMCO.

Education
He has an MBA from Georgetown University McDonough School of Business. He received his undergraduate degree from Washington University in St. Louis.

References

Living people
Year of birth missing (living people)
PIMCO
McDonough School of Business alumni
Washington University in St. Louis alumni
Peterson Institute for International Economics